Dalchhut is a Bangladeshi pop rock band formed by Bappa Mazumder and Sanjeeb Choudhury in November 1996 in Dhaka, Bangladesh.

Formation 
Bappa Mazumder and Sanjeeb Chowdhury first met each other at a local market in Dhaka in 1993. Bappa and Sanjeeb began to work together when Bappa asked Shanjib to work on his solo album. Sanjeeb wrote a number of songs including “Rani Ghumay”, “Chokkhu Khule Dekho” and “Hattimatimtim” for Bappa's inaugural solo album. They worked together in the Aashok Karmokar photo exhibition  'Kalratri' , which impressed the audiences and encouraged the duo to form a band. Sanjeeb proposed Bappa to form a musical group. Bappa agreed and Sanjeeb named the Band Dalchhut. As a result, Dalchhut was formed in November 1996.
The initial line up only included Bappa and Sanjeeb.

History 
In 1997, Dalchhut released their first album, titled Ah. The album failed to catch the eyes of the audience, but the band began to gain public interest and fame when a music video of the song 'Rangila' was shown on television. In regards to the first album, Sanjeeb said that "The weird thing is our first album became a hit after eight months".

In 2000, Dalchhut's second album, Hridoypur was released, did not take long to become a hit. With this album release, the band saw their popularity grow.

In 2002, Dalchhut released a third album titled Aakaashchuri, which also enjoyed popular ratings. It had 11 songs in its first edition. In 2003 it was released again with the song, "Bioscope".

 Dalchhut started shining with a new look with Rumi Rahman (drummer Rumi) on drums and Ratul on bass along with the album Akashchuri, which made a real difference in the sound.

After third album in 2002, Bappa became more busy as his popularity was increasing and at the same time Sanjeeb Chowdhury had been busy with journalism. They started working for Dalchhut's 4th album Jochhnabihar released in 2007, and it was an instant hit.

After the untimely death of Sanjeeb Chowdhury at 2007, Dalchhut released a single tracked album named "Tukro Kotha". The song was made out of one of Sanjeeb Chowdhury's poems.

Kingbodonti, a musical tribute to Sanjeeb Choudhury, by Dalchhut and Souls was released on 25 December. It features the last song recorded by Choudhury.

Dalchhut's latest album, the 6th one of the band, is Aay Amontron, released on 25 December 2010, the 47th birthday of Sanjeeb Chowdhury. With a ceremony named 'Sanjeeb Utshob' the band, with some other fellow musicians, celebrated the birthday of their loving "Sanjeeb'da" and released the new contribution. This new album contains 11 tracks, one of which, the 11th track, 'Notojanu' was written by Sanjeeb Chowdhury himself. In this album they also covered the popular patriotic song "Teerhara Ei Dheuer Shagor" by famous singer and lyricist Apel Mahmud. The album was another hit.

Discography

Ah (1997)

হৃদয়পুর (Heart Full) (2000)

আকাশ চুরি (Stolen Sky) (2002)

জোছনা বিহার (Visiting the Moon) (2007)

টুকরো কথা (Small Talk) (2008)

কিংবদন্তি (A Tribute to Sanjeeb Choudhury) (2008)

এই আমন্ত্রণ (This Invitation) (2010)

Sanjeeb

Members 
Present members
 Bappa Mazumder – vocals, lead guitars 
 Shahan Kabondho – band manager 
 Sohel Aziz – keyboards 
 John Sutton Munshi – bass guitar 
 Wahidur Rahman Masum – lead guitars 
 Sheikh Imran Ahmed Dano – drums 

Past members
 Sanjeeb Chowdhury (died 2007) – lead vocals 
 Hossain Towhidur Rahman Rumi – drums 
 Raquibun Nabi Ratul – bass guitar 
 Koshrose Mohit Rose – percussions, drums 
 Shamim Alam Bulet – keyboards 
 Naimul Hasan Tanim – bass guitar

References

Further reading
 

1996 establishments in Bangladesh
Musical groups established in 1996
Bangladeshi pop music groups